The Swiss Army Romance is the debut studio album by American band Dashboard Confessional, released in March 2000 by Fiddler Records.

Release
It was released through Fiddler Records in March 2000, limited to 1,000 copies. A decision was made shortly afterwards to sell the album to Drive-Thru Records. Drive-Thru released the album on November 14, 2000. In 2003, the rights to the record were sold to Chris Carrabba and Vagrant Records and the album was re-issued on April 22, 2003. The re-release included bonus tracks "Hold On" and "This Is a Forgery". The re-release was spurred by the rising popularity of the band and the announcement of the then upcoming album A Mark, a Mission, a Brand, a Scar.

Reception

The album was included in Rock Sounds 101 Modern Classics list at number 100. It has appeared on a best-of emo album list by Loudwire.

Track listing
All songs written by Chris Carrabba.

"Screaming Infidelities" – 3:33
"The Sharp Hint of New Tears" – 3:02
"Living in Your Letters" – 3:40 
"The Swiss Army Romance" – 3:06
"Turpentine Chaser" – 3:20
"A Plain Morning" – 3:40
"Age Six Racer"  – 2:21
"Again I Go Unnoticed" – 2:24
"Ender Will Save Us All" – 5:13
"Shirts and Gloves" – 2:56

Bonus tracks
"Hold On" (re-issue bonus track) – 2:08
"This Is a Forgery" (re-issue bonus track) – 3:36
"It's Not Easy" (hidden track) – 4:02

Personnel
Personnel per booklet.

Dashboard Confessional
 Chris Carrabba – vocals, guitar

Additional musicians
 John Ralston – additional guitar, backing vocals
 Jolie Lindholm – additional backing vocals
 James Paul Wisner – keys

Production
 James Paul Wisner – producer
 R.J. Shaughnessy – photography
 Keath Moon – graphic design

Chart positions

Album

Singles

References

2000 debut albums
Dashboard Confessional albums
Fiddler Records albums
Vagrant Records albums
Albums produced by James Paul Wisner